Qaleh-ye Azizabad (also Romanized as Qal‘eh-ye ‘Azīzābād; also known as ‘Azīzābād) is a village in Azizabad Rural District, in the Central District of Narmashir County, Kerman Province, Iran. At the 2006 census, its population was 321, in 78 families.

References 

Populated places in Narmashir County